The 1997 Alamo Bowl featured the Purdue Boilermakers, and the Oklahoma State Cowboys.

Oklahoma State took an early 3–0 lead on a field goal. Purdue responded with an 18-yard touchdown pass from Billy Dicken, to take a 7–3 lead. The teams traded field goals before half time, and Purdue led 10–6 at halftime.

In the second half, quarterback Billy Dicken rushed one yard for a touchdown increasing Purdue's lead to 17–6. Running back Jamaal Fobbs sprinted 21 yards for a touchdown pulling OSU to within 17–13. Wide receiver Vinny Sutherland changed the momentum by running for a 19-yard touchdown, extending Purdue's lead to 24–13. Billy Dickens threw a 69-yard touchdown pass to Chris Daniels making the score 30–13. Purdue added a field goal to make the margin 33–13. Oklahoma State scored before the end of the game to make the final 33–20.

References

External links
 Review of the game by USA Today

Alamo Bowl
Alamo Bowl
Oklahoma State Cowboys football bowl games
Purdue Boilermakers football bowl games
Alamo Bowl